Henry Buckingham may refer to:

 Henry Buckingham (publisher), 19th-century newspaper publisher in Kansas
 Sir Henry Buckingham (politician) (1867–1931), British Conservative MP for Guildford 1922–1931

See also